Kim Welshons (1951 – March 15, 2015) was an American synchronized swimming competitor. She won 13 national titles and was part of the American team that won a gold medal at the 1963 Pan American Games. She was 12 at the time, and remains the youngest gold medalist at the Pan American Games. After retiring in 1970, she coached the Mexico national team for two years and served as technical spokesperson for major U.S. television networks for eight years. In 1971, she was inducted into the U.S. Synchronized Swimming Hall of Fame and in 1988 into the International Swimming Hall of Fame. She died of a pancreatic cancer in 2015, aged 64. She was survived by her mother, Kathryn Achelis and her sister, Kris Bennett.

See also
 List of members of the International Swimming Hall of Fame

References

1951 births
2015 deaths
American synchronized swimmers
Pan American Games gold medalists for the United States
Pan American Games medalists in synchronized swimming
Competitors at the 1963 Pan American Games
Medalists at the 1963 Pan American Games